David Toshevski (born 16 July 2001) is a Macedonian football player who plays as a striker for Russian club FC Rostov.

Club career
On 7 July 2020, he signed a five-year contract with Russian Premier League club FC Rostov. He made his debut in the Russian Premier League for Rostov on 15 August 2020 in a game against FC Zenit Saint Petersburg.

On 23 February 2021, he was loaned to Russian Premier League club FC Tambov until the end of the 2020–21 season.

On 31 August 2021, he moved to Polish club Górnik Zabrze on loan for the 2021–22 season, with an option to buy. On 18 February 2022, the loan was terminated early.

Loan at Zemplín Michalovce
On the next day, Toshevski joined Zemplín Michalovce in Slovakia on loan until the end of 2022.

He debuted for Zemplín on 19 February 2022 in an away fixture at pod Dubňom against Žilina. Toshevski came on in the second half to replace Dimitris Popovits with the final score already set at 2-0, following first professional goal by Mario Sauer and a second-half goal by Tomáš Nemčík. Toshevski was also booked with a yellow card after a foul against Ján Minárik in the 85th minute of the match.

References

External links
 
 

2001 births
Footballers from Skopje
Living people
Macedonian footballers
North Macedonia youth international footballers
North Macedonia under-21 international footballers
Association football forwards
FK Rabotnički players
FC Rostov players
FC Tambov players
Górnik Zabrze players
MFK Zemplín Michalovce players
Macedonian First Football League players
Russian Premier League players
Ekstraklasa players
III liga players
Slovak Super Liga players
Macedonian expatriate footballers
Expatriate footballers in Russia
Macedonian expatriate sportspeople in Russia
Expatriate footballers in Poland
Macedonian expatriate sportspeople in Poland
Expatriate footballers in Slovakia
Macedonian expatriate sportspeople in Slovakia